City Museum is a museum whose exhibits consist largely of repurposed architectural and industrial objects, housed in the former International Shoe building in the Washington Avenue Loft District of St. Louis, Missouri, United States. Opened in October 1997, the museum attracted more than 700,000 visitors in 2010.

The City Museum has been named one of the "great public spaces" by the Project for Public Spaces, and has won other local and international awards as a must-see destination. It has been described as "a wild, singular vision of an oddball artistic mind."

History 
City Museum was founded by artist Bob Cassilly and his then-wife Gail Cassilly. The museum's building was once an International Shoe Company factory and warehouse but was mostly vacant when the Cassillys bought it in 1993. Construction began almost immediately after the purchase of the building, and was shrouded in secrecy until visitors were first allowed into the museum to see the work in progress on New Year's Eve 1996. With the construction of the iconic giant whale in the lobby completed in 1997, the museum opened to the public on October 25 of the same year. Within two years, it was drawing 300,000 visitors a year. Cassilly remained the museum's artistic director until his death in 2011.

The museum has regularly expanded, adding new exhibits such as MonstroCity in 2002, Enchanted Caves and Shoe Shaft in 2003, and World Aquarium in 2004. 

A circus ring on the third floor offers daily live acts, and the museum has also hosted concerts. It houses The Shoelace Factory, whose antique braiding machines make colorful shoelaces for sale.

Main building

1st floor
The original part of the museum, the first floor is home to a life-size Bowhead Whale that guests can walk through to view a large fish tank from the mezzanine. Also on the first floor are a number of tunnels that run across the ceiling, hiding above a sea of fiberglass insulation cut to give the impression of icicles. To get into these, one can climb up a giant Slinky, which is an old refrigerating coil (donated by Anheuser-Busch), or through a tree house, that now spans all the way to the third floor, which leads into a giant hollowed-out tree and a cabin on the other side of the floor. The floor itself is covered with the largest continuous mosaic in the US, which morphs its way up columns. In one area is a tunnel known as the "Underground Whaleway" which runs beneath the floor and into the "Original Caves."

One of the museum's most popular attractions, the Enchanted Caves and Shoe Shafts run through the center of the museum all the way to the 10th floor. Opened in 2003, the Caves are an elaborate system of tunnels hand-sculpted by Bob Cassilly and his crew. Since 2007, the Caves have also contained a 1924 Wurlitzer Pipe Organ from the Rivoli Theater in New York City. The Shoe Shafts were developed from structures built for the International Shoe distribution operation. To get the shoes from various floors to the loading dock, staff would place the shoes on spiral shafts. The Shafts opened in 2003 with one three-story spiral slide. Five years later, the museum added a ten-story slide that starts at the roof and leads down to the Caves' entrance. There is also a five-story slide and additional ten-story slide.

The Mezzanine
The Mezzanine contains the museum's food court.

2nd floor
The Vault Room, an 1870s vault withdrawn from the First National Bank of St. Louis, contains two 3,000-pound vault doors and a hall of mirrors. The room also has a marble bar and about 1,000 safety deposit boxes. In the middle of the room is the "hamster wheel", a piece of machinery donated by McDonnell Douglas, which used it to make fuselages for small airplanes. Off to the side of the Vault Room and leading to the Enchanted Caves is St. George's Chamber, which holds vintage opera posters and a statue of St. George from the former Saint George's Catholic Church in Chicago. Also on this floor is The Shoelace Factory, featuring shoelace machines from the 1890s, where visitors can order custom-made laces.

The World Aquarium was an animal exhibition and rehabilitation center on the second floor. It housed a variety of animals such as sharks, rays, sea turtles, parrots, tortoises, terrapins, otters, snakes, alligators and sloths as well as freshwater and saltwater fish. The World Aquarium portion of the City Museum closed on September 7, 2015, and is now located in Laclede's Landing, St. Louis.

3rd floor
The 3rd Floor is home to a number of attractions. In one area is Skateless Park, which is a collection of skateboard ramps. There is also the Everyday Circus, a circus school for all ages. which performs daily at the museum and does private parties. Just around the corner from the Circus is Art City, where guests can try their hand at a number of different art techniques, as well as Toddler Town, a section dedicated to children six years of age and under. Beatnik Bob's is directly across from the Circus, which features the "World's Largest Underwear" (a pair of men's briefs that are about seven feet high and seven feet wide), a collection of vintage video and pinball games, and a concessions stand, bar and coffee shop. Outside Beatnik Bob's is a working 1/8-scale model of an Alco Train that children under 48 inches tall can ride. Past Architectural Hall, the museum's largest rental space, is the Architectural Museum. Off Architectural Hall, the museum is adding a Natural History Section. On display are a number of insects and taxidermy items. An entrance to a three-story slide leads back to the first floor. The third floor is also home to the world's largest pencil, more than 76 feet in length. Weighing 21,500 pounds, the equivalent of 1.9 million regular No. 2 pencils, it includes 4,000 pounds of graphite and a 250-pound rubber eraser. It was created in 2007 for the 76th birthday of Sri Chinmoy by Ashrita Furman, who donated it to the museum, which installed it in 2009.

4th Floor
The 4th floor of the museum contains another food court, an entrance into the caves, Art City, and an art gallery. Art City is a place for people of all ages to partake in crafts Thursday-Sunday 10 a.m.-4 p.m. The art gallery on the 4th floor has featured artist such as Kaws.

The roof
The roof has a small old-fashioned Ferris wheel and a wide ramp slide. The pond fountain, which once had stepping stones that connected one side to the other, has now been covered with astroturf with future plans unknown. The roof also has a school bus extending past the edge of the building. Visitors can walk into the school bus and open the door from the driver's seat. A 24-foot metal praying mantis stands atop a dome salvaged from the St. Louis Science Center during its remodeling. Cassily and his crew added the fiberglass cover and metal ladders that lead to an exit at the top.

Outside

MonstroCity
Located in front of the building, MonstroCity features two Sabreliner 40 aircraft fuselages suspended high in the air, a fire engine, a castle turret, a  cupola, four-foot-wide Slinkies that can be crawled through, one very high that leads to a slide, and two ball pits, one for young children and one for older ones, each pit being filled with large, rubber dodge balls.

The Cabin Inn is an early-19th-century log cabin located beneath MonstroCity. Originally the home of the son of Daniel Boone, it was owned by the Hezel family for more than a century and is now a bar and entertainment venue.

References

External links

 City Museum website
 Very high resolution panoramic images of the museum

Museums established in 1997
Museums in St. Louis
Children's museums in Missouri
Landmarks in Missouri
Art museums and galleries in Missouri
Downtown West, St. Louis
Public venues with a theatre organ
1997 establishments in Missouri
Tourist attractions in St. Louis
Buildings and structures in St. Louis
St. Louis